Peptidyl arginine deiminase, type III, also known as PADI3, is a protein which in humans is encoded by the PADI3 gene.

This gene encodes a member of the peptidyl arginine deiminase family of enzymes, which catalyze the post-translational deimination of proteins by converting arginine residues into citrullines in the presence of calcium ions. The family members have distinct substrate specificities and tissue-specific expression patterns. The type III enzyme modulates hair structural proteins, such as filaggrin in the hair follicle and trichohyalin in the inner root sheath, during hair follicle formation. Together with the type I enzyme, this enzyme may also play a role in terminal differentiation of the epidermis. This gene exists in a cluster with four other paralogous genes.

See also
Protein-arginine deiminase

References

Further reading